Ralph Rodríguez (born 29 July 1941) is a Puerto Rican former sport shooter who competed in the Summer Olympics of 1968, 1976, 1992, 1996 and 2000. He was one of the torch lighters of the 2010 Central American and Caribbean Games.

See also
 List of athletes with the most appearances at Olympic Games

References

1941 births
Living people
Puerto Rican male sport shooters
ISSF rifle shooters
Olympic shooters of Puerto Rico
Shooters at the 1968 Summer Olympics
Shooters at the 1976 Summer Olympics
Shooters at the 1992 Summer Olympics
Shooters at the 1996 Summer Olympics
Shooters at the 2000 Summer Olympics